The 1951 Turkish Football Championship was the 16th and last edition of the competition. It was held in May. Beşiktaş won their fifth national championship title by winning the Final Group in Balıkesir.

The champions of the three major regional leagues (Istanbul, Ankara, and İzmir) qualified directly for the Final Group. Adana Demirspor qualified by winning the qualification play-off, which was contested by the winners of the regional qualification groups.

When Turkish football became officially professional in 24 September 1951, the competition continued under the name Turkish Amateur Football Championship, with only amateur teams participating. However, from that year on it was no longer the first tier football championship in Turkey.

Qualification play-off

First round

Semi-finals

Final

Final group

References

External links
RSSSF

Turkish Football Championship seasons
Turkish
Turkey